Richard Longworth may refer to:

 Richard Longworth (murderer) (1968–2005), American murderer
 Richard Longworth (academic) (died 1579), English churchman and academic
 Richard C. Longworth, American author and journalist